Edson Bispo dos Santos, also commonly known as Edson Bispo (27 May 1935 – 12 February 2011), was a Brazilian professional basketball player and coach.

National team playing career
With the senior Brazilian national basketball team, Dos Santos won bronze medals at the 1960 Summer Olympic Games, and the 1964 Summer Olympic Games. He also won a gold medal at the 1959 FIBA World Cup. In addition, he won bronze medals at the 1955 Pan American Games and the 1959 Pan American Games, and a silver medal at the 1963 Pan American Games.

National team coaching career
Dos Santos was the head coach of the senior Brazilian national basketball team. He coached Brazil at the 1974 FIBA World Cup, and at the Pan American Games of 1967, 1971, and 1975. He also won a gold medal at the 1971 Pan American Games, and a bronze medal at the 1975 Pan American Games.

He also won a gold medal at the 1973 FIBA South American Championship, and a silver medal at the 1976 FIBA South American Championship.

References

External links
FIBA Profile
CBB Profile 

1935 births
2011 deaths
Basketball players at the 1956 Summer Olympics
Basketball players at the 1960 Summer Olympics
Basketball players at the 1964 Summer Olympics
Brazilian basketball coaches
Centers (basketball)
CR Vasco da Gama basketball players
FIBA World Championship-winning players
Olympic basketball players of Brazil
Olympic bronze medalists for Brazil
Olympic medalists in basketball
Medalists at the 1960 Summer Olympics
Medalists at the 1964 Summer Olympics
Basketball players at the 1955 Pan American Games
Basketball players at the 1959 Pan American Games
Basketball players at the 1963 Pan American Games
Pan American Games silver medalists for Brazil
Pan American Games bronze medalists for Brazil
Pan American Games medalists in basketball
Power forwards (basketball)
Small forwards
Sport Club Corinthians Paulista basketball players
Basketball players from Rio de Janeiro (city)
Sociedade Esportiva Palmeiras basketball players
Medalists at the 1955 Pan American Games
Brazilian men's basketball players
1959 FIBA World Championship players